Prothesis may refer to:
 Liturgy of Preparation, also known as Prothesis
 Prothesis (altar)
 Prothesis (linguistics)
 A form of the custom of lying in repose in Ancient Greece; see Ancient Greek funeral and burial practices

See also
Prosthesis (disambiguation)